Archimedes was a celebrated mathematician and engineer of ancient Greece. 

Archimedes may also refer to:

People

Given name
 Archimedes of Tralles, ancient Greek writer
 Arquimedes Caminero (born 1987), Dominican baseball player
 Archimedes Patti (1913–1998), American intelligence officer
 Archimedes Russell (1840–1915), American architect 
 Archimedes Trajano (1956–1977), Filipino torture victim
 Arquimedez Pozo (born 1973), Dominican baseball player

Other usages
 Alfred Thomas Archimedes Torbert (1833–1880), Union general officer during the American Civil War
 Pseudo-Archimedes, pseudo-anonymous writers of the Islamic Golden Age

Places
 Archimedes (crater), an impact crater on the Moon
 Archimedes Ridge, a ridge in Alaska, United States
 Montes Archimedes, a mountain range on the Moon
 3600 Archimedes, an asteroid

Organizations
 Archimedes, Inc., an American healthcare modeling company
 Archimedes Foundation, an independent body established by the Estonian Ministry of Education and Research
 Archimedes Group, an Israeli intelligence agency

Entertainment and media
 Archimedes, Merlin's owl in T. H. White's 1958 novel The Once and Future King and Disney's 1963 film The Sword in the Stone
 Archimedes, a character in the TV series The Little Mermaid
 Archimedes, the Medic's dove from Team Fortress 2

Science and technology
 Archimedes (CAD), an open-source computer-aided design project
 Archimedes Geo3D, a software package for dynamic geometry in three dimensions
 Acorn Archimedes, a home computer
 Claw of Archimedes, an ancient weapon devised by Archimedes
 GNU Archimedes, the GNU package for Monte Carlo semiconductor devices simulations

Transportation
 Archimedes (1797), a ship built in Britain
 SS Archimedes, a steamship built in Britain in 1839
 Archimedes (ship)
 Archimedes (rocket engine)

Other uses
 Archimedes (bryozoan), an extinct genus of fenestrate bryozoan
 Archimedes pyrg, a species of mollusc in the family Hydrobiidae
 Crambus archimedes, a moth in the family Crambidae
 Garden of Archimedes, a museum of mathematics in Florence, Italy

See also
 Archimede (disambiguation)
 Archimedean (disambiguation)
 List of things named after Archimedes

fr:Archimède (homonymie)
it:Archimede (disambigua)